Nathan Rennie (born 31 May 1981) is an Australian professional downhill mountain bike racer. He started riding at the age of 5. He was junior downhill world champion in 1999 and won the bronze medal in the elite category at the 2006 world championships. In the UCI Mountain Bike World Cup, Rennie won the downhill category overall in 2003 and came third in 2004 and 2005. In 2008, he was Australian national downhill champion. In 2020, Rennie was inducted into the Mountain Bike Hall of Fame. Retired from professional racing, Rennie currently resides on the Scenic Rim in Queensland, Australia and is still involved in the sport providing high level coaching and mentoring through Nathan Rennie's Victory Lab.

References

1981 births
Living people
Australian male cyclists
Downhill mountain bikers
Place of birth missing (living people)
Australian mountain bikers